Eugene Anthony Clines (October 6, 1946 – January 27, 2022) was an American professional baseball player and coach. He played in Major League Baseball (MLB) as an outfielder from 1970 to 1979, most prominently as a member of the Pittsburgh Pirates teams that won four National League Eastern Division titles in five seasons between 1970 and 1974, and won the World Series in 1971. He also played for the New York Mets, Texas Rangers, and Chicago Cubs. He batted and threw right-handed. After his playing career, Clines served as a coach for various clubs, including the Cubs, Houston Astros, Seattle Mariners, Milwaukee Brewers, and San Francisco Giants, and an advisor with the Los Angeles Dodgers later in his career.

Playing career
Clines attended Harry Ells High School in Richmond, California. The Pittsburgh Pirates selected Clines in the sixth round of the 1966 MLB draft.

A fast runner with excellent defensive skills, Clines debuted in 1970 with the Pirates as a reserve outfielder, hitting .405 (15-for-37) in 31 games in his rookie year. On September 1, 1971, Clines played in MLB's first-ever all-minority batting lineup.

His most productive season came in 1972, when he posted career-highs in average (.334), doubles (15), and triples (6) in 107 games.

After the 1974 season, the Pirates traded Clines to the New York Mets for Duffy Dyer. After the 1975 season, the Mets traded him to the Texas Rangers for Joe Lovitto. Before the 1977 season, the Rangers sent Clines to the Chicago Cubs as the player to be named later in the earlier trade for Darold Knowles. The Cubs released Clines in May 1979. He batted .277 in 10 MLB seasons.

Coaching career
Clines remained with the Cubs as a coach. He stayed on Chicago's coaching staff until 1981, and then joined the Houston Astros organization as a roving minor league hitting instructor, a position he held through 1987. Later, he worked as a hitting coach for Houston in 1988. The Seattle Mariners hired Clines as their hitting coach before the 1988 season. He spent six seasons as a hitting coach for the Mariners, and was fired after the 1992 season. He was the hitting coach for the Milwaukee Brewers in 1993 and 1994 before joining the San Francisco Giants as a minor league hitting coordinator. After the 1996 season, the Giants promoted him to be their major league hitting coach.

After the 2002 season, Giants' manager Dusty Baker was hired to manage the Cubs. Baker brought Clines to Chicago with him as his first base coach. He was named hitting coach prior to the 2005 season. Baker was fired after the 2006 season, and his coaching staff was dismissed with him.

The Los Angeles Dodgers hired Clines as their roving outfield and base-running instructor in October 2006; he convinced Juan Pierre to sign with the Dodgers the next month. After the 2011 season, he was promoted to the position of senior advisor for player development with the Dodgers.

Personal life
Clines and his ex-wife, Fay, had three children. Clines died at his residence in Bradenton, Florida, on January 27, 2022, at the age of 75.

References

External links
, or Gene Clines - Baseballbiography.com
Chicago Cubs official site

1946 births
2022 deaths
African-American baseball coaches
African-American baseball players
Águilas Cibaeñas players
American expatriate baseball players in the Dominican Republic
Baseball coaches from California
Baseball players from California
Bradenton Explorers players
Chicago Cubs coaches
Chicago Cubs players
Florida Instructional League Pirates players
Houston Astros coaches
Major League Baseball first base coaches
Major League Baseball hitting coaches
Major League Baseball outfielders
Milwaukee Brewers coaches
New York Mets players
People from San Pablo, California
Pittsburgh Pirates players
Raleigh Pirates players
Salem Rebels players
San Francisco Giants coaches
Seattle Mariners coaches
Sportspeople from Bradenton, Florida
Sportspeople from Richmond, California
Texas Rangers players
Tiburones de La Guaira players
American expatriate baseball players in Venezuela
Waterbury Pirates players
York Pirates players
21st-century African-American people
20th-century African-American sportspeople